The flag of the Bashkir Autonomous Soviet Socialist Republic was adopted in 1954 by the government of the Bashkir Autonomous Soviet Socialist Republic. The flag is identical to the flag of the Russian Soviet Federative Socialist Republic.

History

First version 
After the formation of the Bashkir ASSR on 23 March 1919 until the introduction of an official flag on 11 October 1924, a temporary flag was used. The flag was a red cloth with the inscription "А.Б.С.С.Р.", abbreviation of the Autonomous Bashkir SSR, in Bashkir and Russian.

Second version 
In October 1924, on the basis of the decree of the Bashkir Central Election Commission, a Decree of the Bashkir Central Committee dated October 11, 1924, was approved. The decree, "On the change of the State flag of the BASSR", approved the first official state flag of the Autonomous Bashkir SSR. The flag was a rectangular red flag with a golden sickle and red five-pointed star with a gold border.

Third version 
The flag of the Baskhir ASSR was described in the constitution of the Bashkir ASSR, which was adopted by the Central Executive Committee of the Baskhir ASSR on 23 June 1937, at the 10th Congress of the Soviets of the Bashkir ASSR on June 23, 1937. The flag of the Bashkir ASSR is described in Article 112 of the constitution :

Fourth version 
A new flag was approved by the Decree of the Presidium of the CEC of the Bashkir ASSR of February 9, 1938. The flag was changed in accordance to the conversion of the writing system of Bashkir language to Cyrillic alphabet.

Fifth version 
In accordance to the change of the flag of the Russian SFSR, the government of the Bashkir ASSR approved a new flag on March 31, 1954. The flag was described in the amended constitution of the Bashkir ASSR. The flag of the Bashkir ASSR is described in Article 112 of the constitution :

The design was reconfirmed by the Decree of the State Flag of the Bashkir ASSR, which was approved by the PVS of the Bashkir ASSR on January 16, 1956. The decree standardized the usage and proportions of the flag. The decree was amended by the decree of the PVS of March 15, 1956 and the Decree of the VVS of September 22, 1966.

On May 30, 1978, the 8th extraordinary session of the Supreme Council of the Bashkir ASSR of the 9th convocation adopted a new Constitution of the Bashkir ASSR. The flag was described in Article 158 of the new constitution.

Gallery

References

Citations

Bibliography 

Bashkir Autonomous Soviet Socialist Republic